The 3Arena is an indoor amphitheatre located beside the river Liffey at North Wall Quay in the Dublin Docklands in Dublin, Ireland. It was built on the site of the former Point Theatre, a smaller music venue which operated from 1988 to 2007, retaining only some of the outer facade preserved from its original role as a railway goods handling station. The venue opened on 16 December 2008, and was known as the O2 until 4 September 2014, when it was rebranded as the 3Arena, due to the takeover of the telecommunications company O2 Ireland by Three Ireland.

Since opening the venue has been host to some of the world's best known music, comedy, and other acts. Below is a list of performers that have performed at the venue.

Music performances

Comedy performances

 Peter Kay performed a record six consecutive nights at the venue in April/May 2011, all of which sold out.

Notes

References

External links
 Event Listings for the 3Arena

Lists of events in Ireland
Lists of events by venue